Piz de Molinera is a mountain in the Lepontine Alps, located on the border between the cantons of Ticino and Graubünden. It overlooks the junction of the Ticino and the Moesa, north of Arbedo (Ticino).

References

External links
Piz de Molinera on Summitpost

Mountains of Switzerland
Mountains of Graubünden
Mountains of Ticino
Mountains of the Alps
Graubünden–Ticino border
Lepontine Alps
Two-thousanders of Switzerland